The Puerto Rico men's national tennis team represents Puerto Rico in Davis Cup tennis competition and are governed by the Asociación de Tenis de Puerto Rico.

Puerto Rico currently compete in the Americas Zone of Group III.  They reached the Group II final in 1993.

History
Puerto Rico competed in its first Davis Cup in 1992.

Current team (2022) 

 Christian Garay
 Ignacio García
 Alex Llompart (Captain-player)
 Juan Enrique Marrero
 Alex Aguiar

See also

Davis Cup
Puerto Rico Fed Cup team

External links

Davis Cup teams
Davis Cup
Davis Cup